Ladson is a census-designated place (CDP) in Berkeley, Charleston and Dorchester counties in the U.S. state of South Carolina. The population was 13,790 at the 2010 census. It is named in honor of the Ladson family, one of the oldest planter and merchant families in the Charleston area; one of its members was lieutenant governor James Ladson.

Geography
Ladson is located in southwestern Berkeley County, northern Charleston County, and southeastern Dorchester County at  (33.009563, -80.105553). It is bordered to the southwest by the town of Summerville, to the south by the city of North Charleston, to the east by the city of Goose Creek, and to the northwest by Sangaree, a census-designated place.

U.S. Route 78 and Interstate 26 run parallel through Ladson, with Exit 203 providing access from I-26.

Demographics

2020 census

As of the 2020 United States census, there were 15,550 people, 5,046 households, and 3,767 families residing in the CDP.

2000 census
As of the census of 2000, there were 13,264 people, 4,571 households, and 3,560 families residing in the CDP. The population density was 1,540.9 people per square mile (594.8/km2). There were 4,863 housing units at an average density of 564.9 per square mile (218.1/km2). The racial makeup of the CDP was 71.70% White, 22.06% African American, 0.97% Native American, 2.04% Asian, 0.07% Pacific Islander, 1.30% from other races, and 1.86% from two or more races. Hispanic or Latino of any race were 2.97% of the population.

There were 4,571 households, out of which 44.3% had children under the age of 18 living with them, 56.4% were married couples living together, 15.8% had a female householder with no husband present, and 22.1% were non-families. 15.9% of all households were made up of individuals, and 3.0% had someone living alone who was 65 years of age or older. The average household size was 2.90 and the average family size was 3.22.

In the CDP, the population was spread out, with 30% under the age of 18, 9.7% from 18 to 24, 33.7% from 25 to 44, 20.7% from 45 to 64, and 4.9% who were 65 years of age or older. The median age was 31 years. For every 100 females, there were 99.3 males. For every 100 females age 18 and over, there were 96.4 males.

The median income for a household in the CDP was $41,589, and the median income for a family was $44,726. Males had a median income of $31,290 versus $23,524 for females. The per capita income for the CDP was $16,482. About 7.1% of families and 9.8% of the population were below the poverty line, including 13.5% of those under age 18 and 9.3% of those age 65 or over.

References

Census-designated places in South Carolina
Census-designated places in Berkeley County, South Carolina
Census-designated places in Charleston County, South Carolina
Charleston–North Charleston–Summerville metropolitan area
Populated places established in 1905